is a town located in Fukui Prefecture, Japan. ,  the city had an estimated population of 14,577 and the population density of 82 persons per km².

Geography
Wakasa is located in southwestern Fukui Prefecture, bordered by Shiga Prefecture to the south and the heavily indented ria coast of Wakasa Bay of Sea of Japan to the north. Parts of the town are within the borders of the Wakasa Wan Quasi-National Park.

Neighbouring municipalities 
Fukui Prefecture
Obama
Mihama
Shiga Prefecture
Takashima

Climate
Wakasa has a Humid climate (Köppen Cfa) characterized by warm, wet summers and cold winters with heavy snowfall.  The average annual temperature in Wakasa is 14.8 °C. The average annual rainfall is 2115 mm with September as the wettest month. The temperatures are highest on average in August, at around 27.2 °C, and lowest in January, at around 3.7 °C.

Demographics
Per Japanese census data, the population of Wakasa has declined over the past 40 years.

History
Wakasa is part of ancient Wakasa Province. During the Edo period, the area was part of the holdings of Obama Domain. Following the Meiji restoration, it was organised into part of Mikatakaminaka District in Fukui Prefecture. The town of Wakasa was formed on March 31, 2005 by the merger of the former towns of Mikata, from Mikata District, and Kaminaka, from Onyū District.

Economy
The economy of Wakasa is dependent on commercial fishing, agriculture and seasonal tourism.

Education
Wakasa has ten public elementary schools and two public middle schools operated by the town government. The town has one public high school operated by the Fukui Prefectural Board of Education.

Transportation

Railway
  JR West - Obama Line

Highway
 Maizuru-Wakasa Expressway

Notable people
 Tsutomu Sakuma (1879-1910), was a career naval officer in the Imperial Japanese Navy and a pioneer submarine commander

Local attractions
Mikata Five Lakes
Torihama shell mound
Wakasa Mikata Jomon Museum
Kumakawa-juku, one of the nationally protected Groups of Traditional Buildings
Shimofunazuka Kofun, Kamifunazuka Kofun, Nakatsuka Kofun, Nishizuka Kofun, Jōnozuka Kofun, National Historic Sites

References

External links

 

 
Towns in Fukui Prefecture
Populated coastal places in Japan